The Gavilán 358 (English: Sparrow Hawk) is a Colombian light utility transport aircraft of the 1990s. A high-winged monoplane powered by a piston engine, small numbers of Gaviláns were produced in the late 1990s/early 2000s, some serving with the Colombian Air Force.

Development and design
In 1952, Aero Mercantil of Bogota, Colombia, became a dealer for Piper Aircraft, later selling a range of Piper aircraft assembled from kits by Aero Industrial Colombiana SA (AICSA), also in Bogota. In 1986, it started development of a single-engined utility aircraft, suitable for production in Colombia.

The resultant design, the Gavilán, is a simple high-winged monoplane of all-metal construction.  It has a boxlike, square-section fuselage that accommodates a pilot and up to seven passengers, with access through two doors on either side of the cockpit and a large cargo door on the left side of the fuselage. The passenger seats can be removed to allow carriage of cargo, including a full-sized coffin. It is fitted with a fixed tricycle undercarriage designed to withstand continued operations from rough South American airstrips.  It is powered by a 350 hp (261 kW) Lycoming TIO-540-W2A engine, turbocharged to give sufficient power at Colombia's high altitudes.

The first prototype Gavilán made its first flight on 27 April 1990, testing resulting in lengthening of the forward fuselage and modifications to the wing. It was badly damaged in a crash landing due to engine failure in 1992, however, delaying certification and production, with the second prototype not flying until 29 May 1996. The Gavilán received its type certificate under US FAR part 23 regulations in May 1998.

In 2012, Cub Crafters bought from John Bryerton of GATS the Prototype.

Operational history
Deliveries to customers started in 1998, with the first of twelve Gaviláns ordered by the Colombian Air Force being delivered on 25 June that year. El Gavilan SA, of Colombia, was pushing to sell 32 Gavilan 358's to the South African Air Force in April 1998. El Gavilán (as Aero Mercantil was renamed in 1992) had received orders for 19 aircraft by November 1999, but it is unclear whether all of these were built, with Flightglobal estimating in 2008 that only about twelve Gaviláns had been completed. At least four of the Colombian Air Force's Gaviláns were still in use in 2004. The Gavilán was retired in the Colombian Air Force in 2007.

Variants
 G358 – standard version
 G358M – Military version with weapons mountable in the rear doors in the gunship configuration.
 G508T – Turboprop-powered version with 500 hp turboprop, under development.
 G508M – Military version of the turboprop version

Operators

 Colombian Air Force
 Colombian Navy
 Colombian National Police

Specifications

See also

Notes

References

 Homewood, Brian. "Coming around again". Flight International, 6–12 March 1996. pp. 32–33.
 Lambert, Mark (ed.). Jane's All The World's Aircraft 1993–94. Coulsdon, UK: Jane's Data Division, 1993. .
Taylor, John W.R. Jane's All the World's Aircraft 1988–89. Coulsdon, UK:Jane's Information Group, 1988. .
 Taylor, Michael J.H. (ed.). Brassey's World Aircraft & Systems Directory 1999/2000. London:Brassey's, 1999. .
 Wiley, John. "Colombia's Worker Tested". Flight International, 4–10 March 1992. pp. 44–47.
"World Air Forces 2004". Flight International 16–22 November 2004, pp. 41–100.

External links

Technical information 
  Gavilán G358 aircraft brochure
  Gavilán G358 pilot's operating handbook

Manufacturers 
  Gavilán Aircraft Corporation of Colombia Inc. 
  Aero-Industias Leaver & Cía. S.A.

Photos 
  Gavilán G358 aircraft photos by Airliners.Net
  Gavilán G358 aircraft by MyAviation.Net

Videos 
  AVI format or MPEG-4 format

Magazine articles 

  A boxcar designed to be a tough operator
  Gavilan plans US assembly
  Gavilán G358, a heavy hauler
  Gavilan G358, de la Colombie au Canada
  Gavilán G358, l’épervier colombien
  Gavilán: la sentinelle de la Cordillére des Andes

G358
1990s Colombian civil utility aircraft
Single-engined tractor aircraft
High-wing aircraft
Aircraft first flown in 1990